Chuping is a small town in Perlis, Malaysia. It is located to the northeast of Kangar, the state capital. The town has 22,000 hectares of plantations, which consist of rubber estates and the largest sugar cane plantation in Malaysia.

Chuping's name may be taken from a limestone hill in the area called Bukit Chuping. There are many limestone hills in the area, and several caves containing bats. The guano used to be collected for use as a fertiliser, for crops such as rice, as it contains nitrates and iron(III) phosphate.

Climate 
Chuping receives just above  of rainfall annually and with that cumulative of rainfall if compares with other places in Malaysia, Chuping is categorised as one of the driest area in Malaysia. March till November is a wet season.

Accessibility
Chuping is accessible from a trunk road bound for Kangar and Kodiang. The trunk road is situated after the Jitra Selatan exit of the North–South Expressway. Buses that travel along the Kuala Perlis–Kangar route pass through this town.

References

External links
 Chuping

Towns in Perlis
Mukims of Perlis